Sorbus forrestii, Forrest’s rowan, is a species of flowering plant in the family Rosaceae, native to Western China. White flowers in spring are followed by masses of white berries with pink tips in autumn.

The Latin specific epithet forrestii honours the Scottish botanist and plant collector George Forrest (1873-1932), who brought thousands of plant specimens and seeds back to Britain. Forrest had his base in North West Yunnan, which is where S. forrestii originally comes from.

This hardy tree is suitable for cultivation in parks and large gardens. It has gained the Royal Horticultural Society’s Award of Garden Merit.

References

Trees of China
forrestii